Veliky, or similar, may refer to:

Veliky (rural locality) (Velikaya, Velikoye), name of several rural localities in Russia
Veliky (surname)
Velikaya, a river in Pskov Oblast, Russia
Velikaya (Chukotka), a river in Chukotka, Russia

See also
Petr Veliky (disambiguation) or Peter the Great
Sissoi Veliky (disambiguation)
Velika (disambiguation)